Santuario Mártires de Cristo Rey (formerly Tesoro) is the nineteenth station of  Line 1 of Guadalajara's light rail from north to south, and the second in the opposite direction. It is also one of the stations that make up the southern overground section that runs along Av. Cristóbal Colón.

It takes its name from the Santuario de los Mártires (Sanctuary of the Martyrs) built on top of Cerro del Tesoro near the station. Its logo is a stylized image of the controversial temple with its monumental dome highlighted by a cross.

It serves the Nueva España, Balcones de Santa María and Fraccionamiento Cerro del Tesoro neighborhoods.

History 

The original name of the station was Tesoro railway station due to its proximity to the intersection of Avenida del Tesoro that leads to the homonymous hill. The name change was made by the Government of Jalisco in the six-year period 2007-2013 under the influence of the Archdiocese of Guadalajara to encourage "religious tourism" to the Sanctuary in honor of the Mexican Martyrs. Its original logo was the image of a chest with coins, representing a treasure. Points of interest 

 Santuario de los Mártires Mexicanos (under construction).
 Cerro del Tesoro, on the west side of Colón avenue
 Cerro de Santa María, on the east side of Colón avenue

References 

Guadalajara light rail system Line 1 stations